Kings Run is a  long 1st order tributary to the Ararat River in Patrick County, Virginia.

Course
Kings Run rises on the divide of an unnamed tributary to Pine Creek in Patrick County about 0.1 miles southwest of Groundhog Mountain.  Kings Run then flows south to join the Ararat River about 0.5 miles northwest of Ararat, Virginia.

Watershed
Kings Run drains  of area, receives about 53.9 in/year of precipitation, has a wetness index of 296.44, and is about 70% forested.

See also
List of rivers of Virginia

References

Rivers of Virginia
Rivers of Patrick County, Virginia